Mohammadganj block is one of the administrative  blocks of Palamu district, Jharkhand state, India.

References
Blocks of Palamu district

Community development blocks in Palamu district